Spremberg Dam and its associated reservoir (Spremberger Stausee) lie between Cottbus and Spremberg and impound the River Spree. Together with the surrounding countryside they make up the protected landscape also known as the Talsperre Spremberg. The dam itself is made of earth and is the only one in the state of Brandenburg that counts as a "large dam". Its purposes are industrial water supply, flood protection, electricity generation, drought protection and recreation. It was taken into service on 8 October 1965.

References

Dams in Brandenburg
Buildings and structures in Spree-Neiße
Dams completed in 1965
Dam